Jersey Boys: Original Broadway Cast Recording is the Grammy-winning cast album for the 2005 Broadway musical Jersey Boys, the story of Frankie Valli and The Four Seasons.  The album was produced by the original Four Season, Bob Gaudio.  Principal vocals include Christian Hoff as "Tommy DeVito," Daniel Reichard as "Bob Gaudio," J. Robert Spencer as "Nick Massi" and John Lloyd Young as lead-singer "Frankie Valli."  It was released November 1, 2005 by Rhino Entertainment and reached number eighty-five on the Billboard 200. In February 2008, the album was certified Gold by the RIAA.  As of December 2014, the album has sold 1.4 million copies in the US. 

Jersey Boys won four 2006 Tony Awards: Best Musical, Best Actor (John Lloyd Young), Best Featured Actor (Christian Hoff) and Best Lighting (Howell Binkley).

Track listing
 "Ces soirées-là" – 1:16
 "The Early Years: A Scrapbook" – 8:09
 "Cry for Me" – 2:23
 "Backup Sessions" – 1:44
 "Sherry" – 2:14
 "Big Girls Don't Cry" – 2:17
 "Walk Like a Man" – 1:52
 "December, 1963 (Oh, What a Night)" – 2:28
 "My Boyfriend's Back" – 1:32
 "My Eyes Adored You" – 2:26
 "Dawn (Go Away)" – 2:38
 "Big Man in Town" – 2:05
 "Dialogue: A Little Trouble" – 0:17
 "Beggin'" – 2:50
 "Dialogue: See How You Handle It" – 0:15
 "Medley: Stay/ Let's Hang On!/ Opus 17 (Don't You Worry 'bout Me) / Bye, Bye, Baby (Baby Goodbye)" – 4:39
 "C'mon Marianne" – 1:16
 "Can't Take My Eyes Off You" – 3:17
 "Working My Way Back to You" – 1:48
 "Fallen Angel" – 2:06
 "Rag Doll" – 2:14
 "Who Loves You" – 2:55

Certifications

References

Pop albums by American artists
Cast recordings
2005 soundtrack albums
Theatre soundtracks
Rhino Records soundtracks
Pop soundtracks
Grammy Award for Best Musical Theater Album